The Munroe–Dunlap–Snow House in Macon, Georgia is a small house that was built in about 1857.  It appears originally to have been a five-room Victorian cottage.  It is listed on the National Register of Historic Places individually as well as by serving as a contributing building in the Macon Historic District.

It was built for Nathaniel Campbell Munroe who was prominent in Macon in various ways:  as secretary of the Board of Health and of the Macon Lyceum and Library Society, as a director of the Macon and Western Railroad and of the Macon Manufacturing Company, as a warden of Christ Church, as "a great contributor to the cause of the Confederacy".  He owned the house until 1862.

A later owner was Captain Samuel S. Dunlap, leader of the Bibb County Cavalry.  Peter J. Bracken, engineer of The Texas in the Great Locomotive Chase died in the house.

References

Houses on the National Register of Historic Places in Georgia (U.S. state)
National Register of Historic Places in Bibb County, Georgia
Houses completed in 1857
Houses in Macon, Georgia